In mathematics, antipodal points  of a sphere are those diametrically opposite to each other (the specific qualities of such a definition are that a line drawn from the one to the other passes through the center of the sphere so forms a true diameter).

This term applies to opposite points on a circle or any n-sphere.

An antipodal point is sometimes called an antipode, a back-formation from the Greek loan word antipodes, meaning "opposite (the) feet", as the true word singular is antipus.

Theory 
In mathematics, the concept of antipodal points is generalized to spheres of any dimension: two points on the sphere are antipodal if they are opposite through the centre; for example, taking the centre as origin, they are points with related vectors v and −v. On a circle, such points are also called diametrically opposite. In other words, each line through the centre intersects the sphere in two points, one for each ray out from the centre, and these two points are antipodal.

The Borsuk–Ulam theorem is a result from algebraic topology dealing with such pairs of points. It says that any continuous function from Sn to Rn maps some pair of antipodal points in Sn to the same point in Rn. Here, Sn denotes the n-dimensional sphere in (n + 1)-dimensional space (so the "ordinary" sphere is S2 and a circle is S1).

The antipodal map A : Sn → Sn, defined by A(x) = −x, sends every point on the sphere to its antipodal point. It is homotopic to the identity map if n is odd, and its degree is (−1)n+1.

If one wants to consider antipodal points as identified, one passes to projective space (see also projective Hilbert space, for this idea as applied in quantum mechanics).

Antipodal pair of points on a convex polygon 
An antipodal pair of a convex polygon is a pair of 2 points admitting 2 infinite parallel lines being tangent to both points included in the antipodal without crossing any other line of the convex polygon.

References

External links
 
 

Topology